Qanchisqucha (Quechua qanchis seven qucha lake, "seven lakes", hispanicized spellings Canchiscocha) is a group of seven lakes in Peru. They are situated in the Junín Region, Tarma Province, Huasahuasi District.

References 

Lakes of Peru
Lakes of Junín Region